is a dam along the Azusa River in Matsumoto, Nagano Prefecture, Japan, completed in 1968.

References 

Dams in Nagano Prefecture
Dams completed in 1968
Arch dams